WGNV is a Christian radio station broadcasting on 88.5 FM, licensed to Milladore, Wisconsin and serving the Wausau-Stevens Point area. The station's format consists of Christian contemporary music with some Christian talk and teaching. It is branded "The Family" radio network with stations WEMI and WEMY.

Translators

External links
WGNV's website

GNV